Peter "Bonifazius" Düttmann (23 May 1923 – 9 January 2001) was a German Luftwaffe military aviator and fighter ace during World War II. He is credited with 152 aerial victories achieved in 398 combat missions, all of which claimed on the Eastern Front.

Born in Gießen, Düttmann grew up in the Weimar Republic and Nazi Germany. In 1940, he joined the military service of the Luftwaffe where he was trained as a fighter pilot. Following flight training, he was posted to Jagdgeschwader 52 (JG 52—52nd Fighter Wing) in May 1943. Flying with this wing, Düttmann claimed his first aerial victory on 21 May 1943 over a Soviet Air Forces fighter aircraft. Following his 91st aerial victory he was awarded the Knight's Cross of the Iron Cross on 9 June 1944. He claimed his 100th aerial victory on 25 September and was appointed squadron leader of 5. Staffel (5th squadron) of JG 52 in December. He led this squadron until the end of World War II. Düttmann died on 9 January 2001 in Echterdingen.

Early life and career
Düttmann was born on 23 May 1923 in Gießen, at the time in People's State of Hesse in the Weimar Republic. His father was surgeon Dr. Erich Düttmann. Following flight training, Düttmann was transferred to the Ergänzungs-Jagdgruppe Ost (Supplementary Fighter Group East) in southern France. In February 1943, Düttmann and other flight students of Ergänzungs-Jagdgruppe Ost under the leadership of Oberleutnant Walter Krupinski were based at La Leu Airfield near La Rochelle, France. There, Düttmann flew the Arado Ar 96. On some of his flights, he was joined by members of the Kriegsmarine U-boat force who were made aware how easily a surfaced U-boat could be spotted from the air.

World War II
Following completion of flight and fighter pilot training, Düttmann joined 5. Staffel (5th squadron), Jagdgeschwader 52 (JG 52—52nd Fighter Wing) on 7 May 1943. At the time, this squadron led by Leutnant Helmut Haberda who was killed in action on 8 May. Command of 5. Staffel was then temporarily given to Leutnant Josef Zwernemann who passed on command to Oberleutnant Wilhelm Batz on 26 May. The squadron was subordinated to II. Gruppe (2nd group) of JG 52 under the command of Hauptmann Helmut Kühle. II. Gruppe was based at Anapa and was fighting in the Battle of the Caucasus on the Eastern Front. Düttmann served with the same unit until the end of the war and soon became one of their most successful pilots, flying with Heinz Ewald and Heinz Sachsenberg. He claimed his first aerial victory on 21 May 1943 over a Polikarpov Po-2, also known as a U-2, in the vicinity of Krasnodar. He downed another 24 by the end of the year.

On 11 July 1943, Düttmann ditched his Bf 109 G-4 southeast of Anapa in the Black Sea after being hit by return fire form a formation of Douglas Boston medium bombers. In the early hours of 26 July, 15 Ilyushin Il-2 ground-attack aircraft, escorted by Yakovlev Yak-1 fighter aircraft, headed for German shipping off of Anapa. The Soviet flight was intercepted over sea and scattered. During this engagement, German pilots claimed ten aerial victories, five Il-2s and five Yak-1s, including an Il-2 and Yak-1 shot down by Düttmann. One of the aerial victories claimed by Düttmann was also 5. Staffels 500th aerial victory to date.

Following aerial combat on 9 August 1943, he force landed his Bf 109 G-6 (Werknummer 19623—factory number) in no-man's land and was posted missing for 17 hours. On 23 January 1944, Düttmann's Bf 109 G-6 was damaged three times in combat. At 08:00, during takeoff at Baherove, his aircraft was hit in the engine by a strafing Il-2 ground-attack aircraft. Later at 09:03, his Bf 109 G-6 was hit in aerial combat by a Bell P-39 Airacobra fighter aircraft resulting in a forced landing. At 14:45, his aircraft was hit by anti-aircraft artillery causing engine fire in flight. Nevertheless, he managed to return to his airfield and made a deadstick landing at Baherove.

He scored a further 18 kills in March 1944, 22 in April and 14 in May 1944. Düttmann became an "ace-in-a-day" for the first time on 11 April 1944 over the Kerch Peninsula. On 7 May 1944, he claimed nine aerial victories to take his score to 91. Suffering from combat fatigue he was sent on leave at the end of May and returned in September 1944. During this period, he was awarded the Knight's Cross of the Iron Cross on 9 June 1944.

Retreat through Hungary
Düttmann claimed his 100th aerial victory on 25 September 1944. He was the 92nd Luftwaffe pilot to achieve the century mark. On 1 November 1944, Düttmann, flying Bf 109 G-6 (Werknummer 167238), was involved in a ground accident at Ferihegy Airfield, killing his wingman Unteroffizier Heinrich Wester. Low on fuel, Wester had landed his Bf 109 G-14 (Werknummer 782775) first, the engine seized due to lack of fuel, leaving him sitting on the runway. Düttmann, who landed next, did not see Wester and crashed into his aircraft, killing him instantly.

On the 13 November 1944, he was shot down by an Il-2 rear gunner and bailed out at 1000 feet, landing behind enemy lines, but managing to reach German lines. The same happened to him on the 3 March 1945 due to AA damage and he returned a day later. On 23 December 1944, Düttmann was appointed Staffelkapitän (squadron leader) of 5. Staffel of JG 52. He replaced Hauptmann Heinrich Sturm who was killed in a flying accident the day before. On 1 March 1945, this squadron was renamed 6. Staffel of JG 52.

Düttmann died on 9 January 2001.

Summary of career

Aerial victory claims
According to US historian David T. Zabecki, Düttmann was credited with 152 aerial victories. Obermaier also lists Düttmann with 152 aerial victories claimed in 398 combat missions, 21 of which were ground support missions. Both Spick and Weal state that his total of aerial victories was 150 claimed in 398 combat missions, plus two tanks destroyed which were counted as additional victories. Mathews and Foreman, authors of Luftwaffe Aces — Biographies and Victory Claims, researched the German Federal Archives and found records for 147 aerial victory claims, plus 45 further unconfirmed claims, including one North American P-51 Mustang. All of his confirmed victories were claimed on the Eastern Front.

Victory claims were logged to a map-reference (PQ = Planquadrat), for example "PQ 34 Ost 96453". These sectors were then subdivided into 36 smaller units to give a location area 3 × 4 km in size.

Awards
 Pilot's Badge (12 February 1942)
 Iron Cross (1939)
 2nd Class (6 August 1943) 
 1st Class (25 August 1943)
 Front Flying Clasp of the Luftwaffe for Fighter Pilots in Gold (17 August 1943)
 Honour Goblet of the Luftwaffe on 20 March 1944 as Feldwebel and pilot
 German Cross in Gold on 15 April 1944 as Fahnenjunker-Feldwebel in the 5./Jagdgeschwader 52
 Knight's Cross of the Iron Cross on 9 June 1944 as Leutnant (war officer) and pilot in the 5./Jagdgeschwader 52

Dates of rank

Notes

Works

References

Citations

Bibliography

 
 
 
 
 
 
 
 
 
 
 
 
 
 
 
 
 
 

1923 births
2001 deaths
Luftwaffe pilots
German World War II flying aces
Recipients of the Gold German Cross
Recipients of the Knight's Cross of the Iron Cross
People from Giessen
People from the People's State of Hesse
Military personnel from Hesse